New Lebanon is a village in Montgomery County, Ohio, United States. The population was 3,995 at the 2010 census. It is part of the Dayton Metropolitan Statistical Area.

History
New Lebanon was platted in 1843. A post office called Medill was established in 1847, and the name was changed to New Lebanon in 1849. New Lebanon was incorporated as a village in 1878.

Geography
New Lebanon is located at  (39.745729, -84.393494).

Demographics

2010 census
As of the census of 2010, there were 3,995 people, 1,527 households, and 1,057 families living in the village. The racial makeup of the village was 96.2% White, 1.2% African American, 0.1% Native American, 0.4% Asian, 0.1% from other races, and 2.0% from two or more races. Hispanic or Latino of any race were 0.7% of the population.

There were 1,527 households, of which 36.7% had children under the age of 18 living with them, 48.7% were married couples living together, 14.5% had a female householder with no husband present, 6.0% had a male householder with no wife present, and 30.8% were non-families. 26.5% of all households were made up of individuals, and 11.3% had someone living alone who was 65 years of age or older. The average household size was 2.55 and the average family size was 3.08.

The median age in the village was 36.9 years. 26.3% of residents were under the age of 18; 9.1% were between the ages of 18 and 24; 24.5% were from 25 to 44; 24.9% were from 45 to 64; and 15.2% were 65 years of age or older. The gender makeup of the village was 48.3% male and 51.7% female.

2000 census
As of the census of 2000, there were 4,231 people, 1,574 households, and 1,166 families living in the village. The population density was 2,117.0 people per square mile (816.8/km2). There were 1,655 housing units at an average density of 828.1 per square mile (319.5/km2). The racial makeup of the village was 98.46% White, 0.33% African American, 0.09% Native American, 0.17% Asian, 0.24% from other races, and 0.71% from two or more races. Hispanic or Latino of any race were 0.76% of the population.

There were 1,574 households, out of which 37.2% had children under the age of 18 living with them, 56.9% were married couples living together, 13.0% had a female householder with no husband present, and 25.9% were non-families. 23.0% of all households were made up of individuals, and 9.5% had someone living alone who was 65 years of age or older. The average household size was 2.61 and the average family size was 3.07.

In the village, the population was spread out, with 28.4% under the age of 18, 7.2% from 18 to 24, 29.8% from 25 to 44, 20.3% from 45 to 64, and 14.3% who were 65 years of age or older. The median age was 35 years. For every 100 females there were 89.6 males. For every 100 females age 18 and over, there were 87.1 males.

The median income for a household in the village was $40,801, and the median income for a family was $44,063. Males had a median income of $32,188 versus $25,057 for females. The per capita income for the village was $16,718. About 3.3% of families and 5.4% of the population were below the poverty line, including 3.2% of those under age 18 and 9.3% of those age 65 or over.

Education
New Lebanon has a public library, a branch of the Dayton Metro Library. New Lebanon is home to the New Lebanon Local School District, consisting of an Elementary, Middle, and High School.

References

External links
 Village website

Villages in Montgomery County, Ohio
Villages in Ohio
1878 establishments in Ohio
Populated places established in 1878